Byron W. Preston (February 13, 1858 – January 18, 1939) was a justice of the Iowa Supreme Court from 1913 to December 31, 1924, appointed from Mahaska County, Iowa.

Biography
Byron W. Preston was born in Newton, Iowa on February 13, 1858. He attended Iowa College, worked in the mercantile business, read law, and was admitted to the bar in 1884.

He married Nellie Blanchard in 1880, and they had a son and a daughter.

He worked as a county attorney, city attorney, and district court judge before being elected to the Iowa Supreme Court. He remained on the bench from 1913 to 1924.

He died at his home in Oskaloosa, Iowa on January 18, 1939.

References

External links

1858 births
1939 deaths
Grinnell College alumni
Iowa Republicans
Justices of the Iowa Supreme Court
People from Newton, Iowa